The Raw and the Cooked (1964) is the first volume from Mythologiques, a structural study of Amerindian mythology written by French anthropologist Claude Lévi-Strauss. Although the book is part of a larger volume, Lévi-Strauss writes that it may be appreciated on its own merits, stating that he does not consider this first volume a beginning "since it would have developed along similar lines if it had had a different starting point".

In the introduction, Lévi-Strauss writes of his confidence that "certain categorical opposites drawn from everyday experience with the most basic sorts of things—e.g. 'raw' and 'cooked,' 'fresh' and 'rotten,' 'moist' and 'parched,' and others—can serve a people as conceptual tools for the formation of abstract notions and for combining these into propositions." Beginning with a Bororo myth, Lévi-Strauss analyses 187 myths, reconstructing sociocultural formations using binary oppositions based on sensory qualities. The work thus presents an adaptation of Ferdinand de Saussure's theories of structural linguistics applied to a different field.

See also
Culinary triangle

References

1964 non-fiction books
Anthropology books
French non-fiction books
Works by Claude Lévi-Strauss